Symphony 924 (previously known as Symphony 92.4FM) is a 24-hour classical music radio station run by Mediacorp in Singapore. It was the first frequency to be introduced as FM Stereo in Singapore on 18 July 1969.  It is the only classical music radio station in Singapore.

Tagline 
Symphony's current tagline is "Only The Finest Music" and was coined in 2015. Previous taglines are include "Home Of The Arts" (till 2015) and "Classical In All Ways" (1994-2014).

See also 
List of radio stations in Singapore

References

External links 
 Official Website

Radio stations in Singapore
Classical music radio stations
Radio stations established in 1969